Stržišče is a settlement in the hills northeast of Sevnica in east-central Slovenia. The area is part of the historical region of Styria. The Municipality of Sevnica is now included in the Lower Sava Statistical Region.

References

External links
Stržišče at Geopedia

Populated places in the Municipality of Sevnica